Sunder Ramu is an Indian film and stage actor, who has also worked as a photographer. He made his first film appearance in the 2011 drama film Mayakkam Enna. After winning critical acclaim for his performance he has also gone on to feature in Aishwarya Dhanush's 3 in a pivotal role.

Career
After completing his secondary education at The Valley School, Bengaluru, Sunder went to and consequently dropped out of the National School of Drama in Delhi halfway because he could not cope with Hindi. He returned to Chennai to join the Visual Communication course at Loyola College and happened to shoot a portfolio for model Sunita Punjabi who reached the semi-finals of the Femina Miss India competition. This began a career in fashion photography and he has since gone on to work for several different brands. He juggled this with a career as a stage actor, featuring in pantomimes for The Little Theatre for over 10 years. Since the early 1990s, Sunder has acted in about 600 shows with 12 different groups.

Sunder Ramu then collaborated with actor and friend Dhanush in writing three short films, one of which Selvaraghavan took over and turned into Mayakkam Enna. Sunder played a key role in the film alongside Dhanush and Richa Gangopadhyay, and the film released in November 2011 to critical acclaim with a critic from The Hindu mentioning that "Sundar was impressive". In 3, Sunder also featured as a part of the popular Why This Kolaveri Di song, which hit over 5 crore views on video sharing site, YouTube. Then he featured in Balaji Mohan's tamil web series "As I'm Suffering From Kadhal" as one of the lead.

Filmography

References

External links
 
 

21st-century Indian male actors
Male actors in Tamil cinema
Indian male stage actors
Living people
Male actors from Bangalore
Indian male film actors
1973 births